Jean Robinson is a British activist for patient rights. She was the author of the 1988 pamphlet A Patient Voice at the GMC: A Lay Member's View of the General Medical Council, published by Health Rights. She was the chair of the Patients Association from 1973 to 1975. She served as a lay member of the General Medical Council (GMC) in the 1980s. Robinson was appointed a Visiting Professor at the School of Health Sciences of the University of Ulster in 1997.

Robinson and sociologist John L. Anderson hosted an April 1978 episode of the BBC One programme Wordpower about the difficulties of communication with medical professionals. Robinson was a guest on BBC Radio 4's Woman's Hour in August 1974 in a discussion about oral contraceptives.

AIMS
In the 2000s Robinson served as an honorary officer for the Association for Improvements in Maternity Services (AIMS). In 2002 Robinson wrote an article for the British Journal of Midwifery that expressed concern that midwives were not experiencing enough breech births, writing that "Women are losing the opportunity to have vaginal births and those that are being carried out are being carried out by obstetricians. Women are supposed to have a choice. At present only those who can afford a private midwife are likely to get a midwifery breech delivery" and that midwives "...would not have the skills or the confidence to deliver them vaginally. More and more breeches now mean a routine Caesarean". Robinson has also spoken of her belief that a rise in post-traumatic stress disorder among new mothers is linked to higher rates of induced births.

Robinson collaborated with Beverley Lawrence Beech, the Honorary Chair of AIMS, on the second edition of Ultrasound – Unsound? A critique of ultrasound use in maternity care.

References

Living people
British activists
British medical writers
Midwifery in the United Kingdom
Academics of Ulster University
Year of birth missing (living people)